Charles Abbot (24 March 1761 – 8 September 1817) was a British botanist and entomologist.

Life
Abbot was educated at Winchester College and matriculated at New College, Oxford in 1779, with an M.A. degree in 1787. He was elected fellow of the Linnean Society of London in 1793, and he received the degrees of B.D. and D.D. in 1802.

Abbot was vicar of Oakley Raynes and Goldington, in Bedfordshire. He was also Usher of Bedford School, 1787−1817, and chaplain to the Marquess of Tweeddale. He died in Bedford in September 1817.

Works
Abbot is noted for making, in 1798, the first capture in England of Papilio paniscus, the chequered skipper. His writings include the manuscript "Catalogus plantarum" (May 1795); a list of 956 plants of Bedfordshire;, and a later book on the same subject, Flora Bedfordiensis (November 1798). Other works include the 1807 volume of sermons entitled Parochial Divinity. He also wrote a Monody on the Death of Horatio, Lord Nelson, in 1805.

References

 Attribution
 

1761 births
1817 deaths
Alumni of New College, Oxford
English botanists
Fellows of the Linnean Society of London
Parson-naturalists
People from Bedford
Schoolteachers from Bedfordshire